Tour of Yugoslavia was a stage road bicycle race held annually in Yugoslavia. Launched in 1937, the race was held in 1938 and 1940 before interruption due to World War II. In 1947 the first post-war edition was held, and it continued to be organised every year until 2000. Although the race was an event for amateur cyclists during most of its history, it was opened to professional riders in 1998.

Tour of Croatia and Slovenia
The race started as Tour of Croatia and Slovenia (Po Hrvatski in Sloveniji/Kroz Hrvatsku i Sloveniju) in 1937 in 1938. It was held also in 1940, but just on territory of Croatia.

Winners

References

Cycle races in Yugoslavia
Recurring sporting events established in 1937
1937 establishments in Yugoslavia
2000 disestablishments in Yugoslavia
2000 disestablishments in Bosnia and Herzegovina
2000 disestablishments in Croatia
2000 disestablishments in the Republic of Macedonia
2000 disestablishments in Slovenia
Recurring sporting events disestablished in 2000
Defunct cycling races